On the Way to the Sea is a Canadian short documentary film, directed by Tao Gu and released in 2010. The film centres on the director's trip to his childhood home in Wenchuan County, China, following the 2008 Sichuan earthquake.

The film was made as Gu's thesis project for the film studies program at the Mel Hoppenheim School of Cinema.

The film premiered at the 2010 Toronto International Film Festival. It was subsequently named to TIFF's year-end Canada's Top Ten list for 2010.

References

External links

2010 films
2010 short documentary films
Canadian short documentary films
Films about Chinese Canadians
2010s Canadian films